The 1959 Ottawa Rough Riders finished in 2nd place in the Interprovincial Rugby Football Union with an 8–6 record but lost to the Hamilton Tiger-Cats in the East Finals.

Preseason

Regular season

Standings

Schedule

Postseason

Playoffs

References

Ottawa Rough Riders seasons
1959 Canadian Football League season by team